Wincencin  is a village in the administrative district of Gmina Urszulin, within Włodawa County, Lublin Voivodeship, in eastern Poland.

References

Wincencin